Kaxararí is a Panoan language of Brazil. It is spoken around the northwest border of the State of Rondônia. The Kaxarari language is the most divergent of the Mainline Panoan branch.

References

Panoan languages
Mamoré–Guaporé linguistic area